Kwik Kian Gie (born 11 January 1935) is an Indonesian economist and politician who served as the Coordinating Minister for Economic Affairs from 1999 to 2000, the Minister of National Development Planning from 2001 to 2004, as well as briefly serving as the Deputy Speakers of the People's Consultative Assembly in 1999. He is a prominent Indonesian economist who often wrote columns in the newspaper KOMPAS criticizing the policies of the Suharto administration in the late 1980s and 1990s.

Early life
Following working in a teaching post in the Economics Department in the University of Indonesia, he undertook further studies in the Nederlandse Economische hogeschool (currently Erasmus University Rotterdam) in Rotterdam, the Netherlands.

Career
After a few years working in the Netherlands following his graduation he returned to Indonesia and held several executive positions and became an entrepreneur.
He maintained a strong interest in politics and education, and said to the press that, "I now have enough  money to pay for anything I can wish for," and with that started his involvement with the PDI-P opposition political party of Megawati Sukarnoputri.

He also founded Institut Bisnis & Informatika Indonesia (IBII) which is now known as Kwik Kian Gie School of Business, a business/management school in Indonesia, with his colleagues.

Candidacy
During the rise of Megawati Sukarnoputri he was mentioned as a possible candidate for the important post of Coordinating Minister of Economics and Finance. He was appointed to the position by Abdurrahman Wahid in the Wahid Cabinet in October 1999. However, various political hurdles prevented him from making much progress during his term in office.  He was later moved to the position of Minister of National Development and Planning. His period as minister was seen by some as a disappointment.

References

External links
 Profile at TokohIndonesia.com

1935 births
Living people
People from Pati Regency
Indonesian people of Chinese descent
Indonesian Hokkien people
Academic staff of the University of Indonesia
Indonesian politicians of Chinese descent
Indonesian Democratic Party of Struggle politicians
Indonesian economists